The OL postcode area, also known as the Oldham postcode area, is a group of sixteen postcode districts in north-west England, within seven post towns. These cover eastern Greater Manchester (including Oldham, Rochdale, Ashton-under-Lyne, Heywood and Littleborough), plus small parts of east Lancashire (including Bacup) and western West Yorkshire (including Todmorden).



Coverage
The approximate coverage of the postcode districts are:

|-
! OL1
| OLDHAM
| Chadderton, Higginshaw, Oldham
| Oldham
|-
! OL2
| OLDHAM
| Heyside, Royton, Shaw
| Oldham
|-
! OL3
| OLDHAM
| Delph, Denshaw, Diggle, Dobcross, Greenfield, Uppermill
| Oldham
|-
! OL4
| OLDHAM
| Austerlands, Grasscroft, Grotton, Lees, Lydgate, Oldham, Scouthead, Springhead, Waterhead
| Oldham
|-
! OL5
| ASHTON-UNDER-LYNE
| Mossley, Mossley Cross
| Tameside
|-
! OL6
| ASHTON-UNDER-LYNE
| Ashton-under-Lyne (centre and east)
| Tameside
|-
! OL7
| ASHTON-UNDER-LYNE
| Ashton-under-Lyne (west)
| Tameside
|-
! OL8
| OLDHAM
| Bardsley, Oldham
| Oldham
|-
! OL9
| OLDHAM
| Chadderton, Oldham, Westwood, Freehold
| Oldham
|-
! OL10
| HEYWOOD
| Heywood
| Rochdale
|-
! OL11
| ROCHDALE
| Rochdale (south), Ashworth, Balderstone, Castleton, Norden
| Rochdale
|-
! OL12
| ROCHDALE
| Rochdale (north), Buckley, Facit, Great Howarth, Healy, Hurstead, Shawforth, Wardle, Whitworth
| Rochdale, Rossendale 
|-
! OL13
| BACUP
| Bacup, Britannia, Stacksteads
| Rossendale
|-
! OL14
| TODMORDEN
| Cornholme, Todmorden, Eastwood, Walsden
| Calderdale
|-
! OL15
| LITTLEBOROUGH
| Littleborough, Shore, Smithybridge, Summit
| Rochdale
|-
! style="background:#FFFFFF;"|OL16
| style="background:#FFFFFF;"|LITTLEBOROUGH
| style="background:#FFFFFF;"|
| style="background:#FFFFFF;"|non-geographic
|-
! OL16
| ROCHDALE
| Rochdale (east), Burnedge, Firgrove, Hurstead, Milnrow, Smallbridge, Thornham
| Rochdale
|-
! style="background:#FFFFFF;"|OL95
| style="background:#FFFFFF;"|OLDHAM
| style="background:#FFFFFF;"|British Gas
| style="background:#FFFFFF;"|non-geographic
|}

Map

See also
Postcode Address File
List of postcode areas in the United Kingdom

References

External links
Royal Mail's Postcode Address File
A quick introduction to Royal Mail's Postcode Address File (PAF)

Metropolitan Borough of Oldham
Tameside
Metropolitan Borough of Rochdale
Calderdale
Postcode areas covering North West England